Drokpa katsa is a Tibetan cuisine dish of stewed tripe, with curry, fennel, monosodium glutamate and salt.

See also
 List of stews
 List of Tibetan dishes

References

Tibetan stews